Benvenuto may refer to:

People
 Andrea Koch Benvenuto (born 1985), Chilean tennis player
 Benvenuto Cellini (1500–1571), Italian goldsmith, painter, sculptor, soldier and musician
 Benvenuto Rambaldi da Imola (circa 1320–1388), Italian writer
 Benvenuto Tisi (1481–1559), Italian painter
 Pietro Benvenuto (1769–1844), Italian painter
 Pietro Benvenuto degli Ordini (15th century), Italian architect
 Emil Benvenuto (1931–2011), American businessman and politician

Music
 "Benvenuto" (song), a 2011 song by Italian singer-songwriter Laura Pausini
"Benvenuto", song by Vasco Rossi Nessun Pericolo...Per Te 1996	

Italian masculine given names